Miodrag Anđelković (Serbian Cyrillic: Миодраг Анђелковић; born 7 February 1977) is a Serbian former professional footballer who played as a striker, and a football manager.

A journeyman, Anđelković represented 21 clubs from 14 different countries in 15 years of his active playing career.

Playing career
Born in Titova Mitrovica, Anđelković started out at his hometown club Trepča. He joined OFK Beograd as a youngster, making his senior debuts during the 1995–96 season. In the 1997 winter transfer window, Anđelković went abroad to Spain and signed with Espanyol. He made two La Liga appearances, before switching to Segunda División side Almería until the end of the 1996–97 season. Subsequently, Anđelković played for SpVgg Greuther Fürth and Hapoel Petah Tikva, before returning to OFK Beograd in 1999. He scored nine league goals for the side in the 1999–2000 campaign, before switching to Sartid Smederevo in March 2000, netting seven more for a total of 16 goals that season. In June 2000, Anđelković moved abroad again and signed for Turkish side Antalyaspor, alongside Nikola Damjanac.

Over the following decade, Anđelković would go on to play in Brazil (Fluminense and Coritiba), Poland (Widzew Łódź), South Korea (Incheon United), Japan (Cerezo Osaka), Kazakhstan (Irtysh Pavlodar), China (Dalian Shide and Yantai Yiteng), as well as in Romania (Pandurii Târgu Jiu and Internațional Curtea de Argeș).

In 2010, Anđelković went overseas to Canada to sign with Brantford Galaxy of the Canadian Soccer League. He helped them win the CSL Championship against Hamilton Croatia. On 21 July 2010, Anđelković was part of the Toronto FC side in an international friendly against Bolton Wanderers at BMO Field. He lastly played for Mladenovac in his homeland during the 2011–12 season.

Post-playing career
In September 2013, Anđelković was appointed as assistant manager to Zlatko Krmpotić at OFK Beograd. He later also served as an assistant to Petar Divić and Žarko Todorović. In October 2018, Anđelković acted as OFK Beograd caretaker manager in one Serbian League Belgrade game. In 2020, he was named the manager for OFK Beograd on a full time basis. On December 7, 2021 he announced his departure from OFK Beograd.

Statistics

Honours
Brantford Galaxy
 Canadian Soccer League: 2010

References

External links
 
 
 
 
 

 

2. Bundesliga players
Al-Ahli Saudi FC players
Antalyaspor footballers
Association football forwards
Brantford Galaxy players
Campeonato Brasileiro Série A players
Canadian Soccer League (1998–present) players
Cerezo Osaka players
China League One players
Chinese Super League players
Coritiba Foot Ball Club players
CS Pandurii Târgu Jiu players
Dalian Shide F.C. players
Ekstraklasa players
Expatriate footballers in Brazil
Expatriate footballers in China
Expatriate footballers in Germany
Expatriate footballers in Israel
Expatriate footballers in Japan
Expatriate footballers in Kazakhstan
Expatriate footballers in Poland
Expatriate footballers in Romania
Expatriate footballers in Saudi Arabia
Expatriate footballers in South Korea
Expatriate footballers in Spain
Expatriate footballers in Turkey
Expatriate footballers in Ukraine
Expatriate soccer players in Canada
FC Internațional Curtea de Argeș players
FC Irtysh Pavlodar players
FC Metalurh Zaporizhzhia players
First League of Serbia and Montenegro players
FK Smederevo players
Fluminense FC players
Hapoel Petah Tikva F.C. players
Incheon United FC players
J1 League players
K League 1 players
Kazakhstan Premier League players
Kosovo Serbs
La Liga players
Liga I players
OFK Beograd managers
OFK Beograd players
OFK Mladenovac players
Sportspeople from Mitrovica, Kosovo
RCD Espanyol footballers
Saudi Professional League players
Segunda División players
Serbia and Montenegro expatriate footballers
Serbia and Montenegro expatriate sportspeople in Brazil
Serbia and Montenegro expatriate sportspeople in Germany
Serbia and Montenegro expatriate sportspeople in Japan
Serbia and Montenegro expatriate sportspeople in South Korea
Serbia and Montenegro expatriate sportspeople in Spain
Serbia and Montenegro expatriate sportspeople in Turkey
Serbia and Montenegro expatriate sportspeople in Ukraine
Serbia and Montenegro footballers
Serbian expatriate footballers
Serbian expatriate sportspeople in Canada
Serbian expatriate sportspeople in China
Serbian expatriate sportspeople in Romania
Serbian First League players
Serbian football managers
Serbian footballers
Serbian SuperLiga players
SpVgg Greuther Fürth players
Süper Lig players
UD Almería players
Ukrainian Premier League players
Widzew Łódź players
Zhejiang Yiteng F.C. players
1977 births
Living people
Serbia and Montenegro expatriate sportspeople in Israel
Serbian expatriate sportspeople in Poland
Serbian expatriate sportspeople in Kazakhstan
Serbian expatriate sportspeople in Saudi Arabia